Ølby railway station is a railway station serving the suburb of Ølby Lyng in the municipality of Køge, Denmark. It is served by the Køge radial of Copenhagen's S-train network, and by Østbanen to Roskilde and Faxe. In April 2023, DSB will start operating regional trains on the Næstved–Køge–Ølby–Copenhagen route via the high speed Copenhagen–Køge Nord Line.

References

External links

Buildings and structures in Køge Municipality
S-train (Copenhagen) stations
Railway stations in Region Zealand
Railway stations opened in 1983
Railway stations in Denmark opened in the 20th century